Partners for Sacred Places is an American non-sectarian, non-profit organization whose mission is the support of older and historic sacred places by helping congregations and local communities sustain and actively use the structures.

Founded in 1989, Partners has helped several thousand congregations and other local organizations protect their community-serving sacred places in towns and cities across America.

Partners works with the National Trust for Historic Preservation to help communities adapt former religious properties for new uses—and retained them as important anchors and architectural landmarks.

Partial list of projects
Mother Bethel A.M.E. Church
St. Francis de Sales Church, Philadelphia
Third Presbyterian Church (Chester, Pennsylvania)
Touro Synagogue

See also
Historic preservation
Architectural history
America's Most Endangered Places
Oldest synagogues in the United States

External links
Official website

1989 establishments in Pennsylvania
Organizations based in Philadelphia
Religious organizations based in the United States
Heritage organizations
Organizations established in 1989